Liostola nitida is a species of beetle in the family Cerambycidae, the only species in the genus Liostola.

References

Hesperophanini